John M. Allen (born in Long Island, New York) is an American politician and a Republican member of the Arizona House of Representatives representing District 15 since January 14, 2013. Allen previously served non-consecutively from January 2001 until January 2005 in the District 7 and 11 seats.

Education
Allen graduated from Arizona State University.

Elections
 2012 – Running in District 15, with incumbent Democratic Representatives Katie Hobbs running for Arizona Senate and Lela Alston redistricted to District 24, and with incumbent Republican Representative David Smith redistricted from District 7, Allen ran in the four-way August 28, 2012 Republican Primary, placing second with 7,813 votes, and Smith placed third. Allen won the second seat in the November 6, 2012 General election with 46,612 votes above Democratic nominee Patricia Flickner.
 2000 – To challenge incumbent Republican Representatives Carolyn Allen and Wes Marsh for the District 28 seat, Allen ran in the four-way September 12, 2000 Republican Primary, placing third behind them; they went on to win the November 7, 2000 General election, and Carolyn Allen later served in the Arizona Senate.
 2002 – Redistricted to District 7, and with incumbent Democratic Representatives Cheryl Chase and Mark A. Clark redistricted to District 23, Allen ran in the six-way September 10, 2002 Republican Primary, placing first with 3,424 votes, and won the first seat in the three-way November 5, 2002 General election with 24,138 votes above fellow Republican Ray Barnes and Democratic nominee Virgel Cain; Barnes served in the seat from 2003 until 2011.
 2004 – Switching to District 11, and with incumbent Republican Representative Deb Gullett departing the Legislature, Allen ran alongside Stephen Tully in the four-way September 7, 2004 Republican Primary, placing second with 8,454 votes, and won the second seat in the November 2, 2004 General election with 44,054 votes above Libertarian candidates Garry Myers and James Iannuzo.
 2006 – With Republican Representative Stephen Tully departing the Legislature, Allen ran in the four-way September 12, 2006 Republican Primary, placing third behind Adam Driggs and Don Hesselbrock, Driggs and Democratic nominee Mark Desimone won the district's seats in the November 7, 2006 General election; Driggs later served in the Arizona Senate.
 2008 – Running for one of the three seats up for election on the Arizona Corporation Commission, Allen ran in the eight-way September 2, 2008 Republican Primary, placing fourth behind Bob Stump, former state Representative Marian McClure, and Barry Wong; in the November 4, 2008 General election, Democratic former state Senator Sandra Kennedy placed first, Democratic former state Representative Paul Newman placed second, and Stump took the third seat.

References

External links
 Official page at the Arizona State Legislature
 Campaign site
 
 Biography at Ballotpedia
 Financial information (state office) at the National Institute for Money in State Politics

21st-century American politicians
Arizona State University alumni
Living people
Republican Party members of the Arizona House of Representatives
People from Long Island
Year of birth missing (living people)